Bury Me in Philly is the third solo album by Dave Hause of The Loved Ones. It was released on February 3, 2017 by Rise Records.

The first song premiered from the album was "With You", which was released for streaming at Noisey on December 8, 2016, and was released on iTunes and Spotify soon after.

Critical reception

Bury Me in Philly received mostly positive reviews from music critics. Q gave the album 4 stars, and referred to it as "A moving reflection on his own life, family and home, it's the sound of Dave Hause getting to grips with himself."

Track listing

Charts

References

2017 albums
Dave Hause albums
Rise Records albums